Jacqueline Marian Cramer (born 10 April 1951)  is a retired Dutch politician of the Labour Party (PvdA) and biologist.

Cramer was Minister of Housing, Spatial Planning and the Environment in the Fourth Balkenende cabinet for the PvdA. Previously she was a professor of sustainable entrepreneurship at Utrecht University and professor of environmental management at Erasmus University. She is member of the board of directors at Royal Dutch Shell and a member of the Social-Economic Council.  Eisenhower Fellowships selected Jacqueline Cramer in 1992 to represent The Netherlands.

Cramer studied biology in Arkansas and at the University of Amsterdam. In 1987 she obtained her Ph.D. with Mission-orientation in Ecology. The Case of Dutch Fresh-water Ecology, with honours. She has two children and lives in Amsterdam.

Decorations

References

External links

Official
  Dr. J.M. (Jacqueline) Cramer Parlement & Politiek

 
 
 

1951 births
Living people
Dutch academic administrators
Dutch biologists
Dutch corporate directors
Dutch education writers
Dutch expatriates in the United States
Dutch management consultants
Dutch natural scientists
Dutch nature writers
Dutch nonprofit directors
Dutch nonprofit executives
Dutch women academics
Dutch women environmentalists
Environmental writers
Academic staff of Erasmus University Rotterdam
Labour Party (Netherlands) politicians
Members of the Social and Economic Council
Members of the Royal Netherlands Academy of Arts and Sciences
Ministers of Housing and Spatial Planning of the Netherlands
Officers of the Order of Orange-Nassau
Politicians from Amsterdam
People from Arnhem
Academic staff of Tilburg University
Scientists from Amsterdam
University of Amsterdam alumni
Academic staff of the University of Amsterdam
University of Arkansas alumni
Academic staff of Utrecht University
Women government ministers of the Netherlands
Writers from Amsterdam
20th-century Dutch civil servants
20th-century Dutch educators
20th-century Dutch scientists
20th-century Dutch women writers
21st-century Dutch civil servants
21st-century Dutch educators
21st-century Dutch scientists
21st-century Dutch women politicians
21st-century Dutch politicians
21st-century Dutch women writers
20th-century women educators
21st-century women educators